Pallamano Pressano is a men's handball club from Lavis, Italy, that plays in the Serie A.

Team

Current squad 
Squad for the 2022–23 season

Goalkeepers
1  Simone Facchinelli 
28  Nikolaos Loizos 

Wingers
RW
5  Marco Chistè
11  Francesco Rossi
LW 
6  Matteo Moser

Line players 
19  Gabriele Sontacchi
22  Nicola Folgheraiter 
31  Alberto Gazzini

Back players
LB
23  Nicola Rossi
24  Nicola Moser
CB 
10  Pascal d'Antino 
15  Nacor Medina Perez
30  Juan Francisco Ceccardi 

 
RB
2  Alessandro Dallago

External links
Official website

Pallamano Pressano
Sport in Trentino